Peeka may refer to:
 PK machine gun, a machine gun from the former Soviet Union
 Peeka (game), a game similar to Hide-and-seek played between Cheebies and Piplings in the children's TV series Waybuloo